Kévin Marc-François Malaga (born 24 June 1987) is a French footballer who plays as a centre-back.

Club career

Auxerre
Born in Toulon, Malaga started his senior career playing for AJ Auxerre's B team in 2008, having previously played for the team's youth squads, and SC Toulon. He made a single league appearance for the full AJ Auxerre squad in 2010.

Nice
In 2011 Malaga switched to OGC Nice where he played twice for the senior squad and was captain of the reserve team.

Coventry City
On 13 July 2012, Malaga joined Football League One side Coventry City on a free transfer after his Nice contract had expired having agreed a three-year deal. Unable to fully break into the Coventry team, he had a brief loan spell at Nuneaton Town. His contract with Coventry City was terminated by mutual consent on 2 September 2013.

Career statistics

References

1987 births
Living people
Sportspeople from Toulon
French footballers
Association football defenders
Ligue 1 players
Championnat National players
AJ Auxerre players
OGC Nice players
Coventry City F.C. players
Nuneaton Borough F.C. players
SC Toulon-Le Las players
Pau FC players
SO Cholet players
English Football League players
National League (English football) players
Footballers from Provence-Alpes-Côte d'Azur